Japanese female vocal/dance unit, MAX has released five studio albums, two compilations, three remix albums, and 31 singles. Three of their albums, Maximum (1996), Maximum Groove (1998), and Maximum Collection have topped the Oricon album charts. Four of their albums, including Maximum, Maximum II (1997), Maximum Groove, and Maximum Collection have been certified million selling albums by RIAJ. The group have 15 consecutive top ten singles, 16 overall. Their sixth single, "Give Me a Shake" (1997) is their best selling single and their only single to top the Oricon singles chart. Since their debut on May 10, 1995, the group has amassed sales of over 10 million albums and singles in Japan.

Albums

Studio albums

Cover album

Mini-album

Compilation albums

Remix albums

Participation in tribute and cover albums

Participation in other albums

Singles

B-sides

Filmography

Films

Music videos

Live concerts

Other

References 

Discographies of Japanese artists
Pop music group discographies